American singer Steve Grand has released two studio albums, four singles and two promotional singles. His debut album All American Boy was released on March 23, 2015. Grand released his second album Not The End Of Me independently on his own label on July 6, 2018. The album debut in the top 10 of the Billboard independent chart at the number 10 position on July 21, 2018.

Studio albums

Singles

As lead artist

Promotional singles

Music videos

Footnotes

References

External links
 

Pop music discographies
Discographies of American artists
Country music discographies